Naranbhai J. Rathwa (born 1 June 1953) was a member of the 9th, 10th, 11th, 12th & 14th Lok Sabha of India. He represented the Chhota Udaipur constituency of Gujarat and is a member of the Indian National Congress.

He was a Minister of State in the Ministry of Railways. He lost to Ramsinh Rathwa in 2009 Lok Sabha Elections

External links
 Official biographical sketch in Parliament of India website

1953 births
Living people
People from Gujarat
Indian National Congress politicians
India MPs 2004–2009
Union ministers of state of India
India MPs 1989–1991
India MPs 1991–1996
India MPs 1996–1997
India MPs 1998–1999
People from Vadodara
Lok Sabha members from Gujarat
People from Chhota Udaipur district
Indian National Congress politicians from Gujarat